Gwinner–Roger Melroe Field  is a public use airport located one nautical mile (2 km) southeast of the central business district of Gwinner, a city in Sargent County, North Dakota, United States. It is owned by the Gwinner Airport Authority. It is also referred to as Gwinner Municipal Airfield.

The field is named for Roger Melroe of the Melroe Company in Gwinner, the company that developed the "Bobcat" brand skid-steer loader.

History 
In 1967, the Gwinner Municipal Airport Authority proposed to construct a new municipal airport, which was completed in 1969. At the time it had a 3,600 foot lighted asphalt runway and an unlighted 2,500 foot turf strip. In 1975 the asphalt runway was extended from to 5000 feet in length. The airport was rededicated "Roger Melroe Field" in 1986.

Facilities and aircraft 
It has two runways: 16/34 is 4,986 by 60 feet (1,520 x 18 m) with an asphalt pavement; 6/24 is 2,950 by 100 feet (899 x 30 m) with a turf surface.

For the 12-month period ending December 31, 2007, the airport had 4,120 aircraft operations, an average of 11 per day: 51% air taxi, 49% general aviation, <1% military. At that time there were 13 aircraft based at this airport: 85% single-engine and 15% multi-engine.

References

External links 
 Gwinner Roger Melroe Field
 
 

Airports in North Dakota
Buildings and structures in Sargent County, North Dakota
Transportation in Sargent County, North Dakota